Schagen is a city and municipality in the northwestern Netherlands. It is located between Alkmaar and Den Helder, in the region of West Friesland and the province of North Holland. It received city rights in 1415. In 2013, Schagen merged with Zijpe and Harenkarspel. Together they have formed a new municipality, which is also called Schagen. The townhall is located in the main town of Schagen.

Before the merger in 2013 the municipality of Schagen only consisted of the town of Schagen. In 2013 the municipality was extended with neighbouring municipalities.

History

10th through 15th century
Schagen has been mentioned in various texts from around 975. One of them was a population count that found that 43 people were living there. Schagen was also mentioned in documents as Scagha from around 989. At this time Schagen was a center of artificial dwelling hills. Perhaps the name refers to Scagha to its location above land water: it could mean "elevated point". Some time later, there is a coastline near Schagen. When the sea retreated again at the end of the 13th century the places in the region grew. The land around Schagen was especially fertile, so it grew and remained the main town in the area.

William VI granted in 1415 city rights to the town. In 1427 Philip the Good of Burgundy loaned Schagen to his uncle William of Bronckhorst, one of the seven illegal children of Albrecht of Bavaria, and to Maria van Bronckhorst. Schagen became a fief with some regional rights in addition to its city rights, including some control over the small towns around Schagen. William ordered the castle in which he lived from 1440. In 1460 the church of Schagen, dedicated to St. Christopher, was consecrated. In 1463 Schagen received the right to hold a cattle market and became a trading town for a wider region.

16th through 19th century
From 1603 an annual horse market was held in Schagen, upon authorization by the States of Holland and Westfriesland.

At the beginning of the Golden Age Schagen underwent very little growth, unlike other cities in the region: Alkmaar, Enkhuizen, Medemblik, and Hoorn. Later in the Golden Age the city benefited from the increased prosperity, but never to the degree these other cities enjoyed. Even after the Golden Age growth was limited. Partly due to the reclamation of the surrounding area, Schagen could flourish economically again in the 19th century. In particular, the cattle market played an important role. When in 1865 the railroad between Alkmaar and Den Helder came into use, the market and home industries flourished. Schagen had about 2060 inhabitants at this time.

In 1894 Schagen was shocked by a double murder, when 17-year-old Klaas Boes murdered his 55-year-old neighbor and her 17-year-old niece. The murder attracted wide national media attention and caused the murderer's mother to commit suicide. Newly appointed mayor Simon Berman headed a committee that would pay 750 guilders, donated by the residents, for the golden tip. In 1895 Klaas Boes was sentenced to life imprisonment, but this was later changed to 25 years. Klaas Boes was released from prison in 1922 and died in 1956. For years, "Klaas Boes" remained a stereotypical name in the Netherlands for youngsters who were up to no good.

20th through 21st century
During the 20th century prosperity decreased slowly. Especially after the Second World there was a sharp decline in the agricultural sector. As Schagen did not only depended on agriculture, the decline was less than in surrounding rural communities. Around 1960 Schagen started to flourish again, though population was still below 5,000. The seventies were a large boom for Schagen. In the early nineties, the growth gradually diminished but Schagen remained relatively strong compared to neighboring nuclei and municipalities.

From 2005 to 2007, Schagen resident Johan Huibers built a ship modeled after the biblical description of Noah's Ark in Schagen. Johan's Ark was opened to the public in April 2007 and later towed between various port cities in the Netherlands.

Transportation
At Schagen railway station Intercity trains stop, providing good connectivity with Den Helder to the North as well as Alkmaar and Amsterdam to the South. All south-bound trains pass through Amsterdam Centraal, and then continue through Utrecht Centraal either to Eindhoven and Maastricht or to Arnhem and Nijmegen. The journey time to Amsterdam is 51 minutes (Sloterdijk) or 57 minutes (Centraal.)

The railway station is Schagen's hub for local and regional bus services.

, three of the five operational vlotbruggen ("float bridges") are in Schagen: at Burgervlotbrug, at Sint Maartensvlotbrug, and at 't Zand.

Politics 
The municipal council of Schagen consists of 29 seats, which are divided as follows:

Notable people 

 Adriaen van Cronenburg (1525 in Schagen – after 1604) a painter, mainly of portraits. 
 Jan van Noordt (1623/24 in Schagen – after 1676) was a Dutch Golden Age painter
 Simon Berman (1861 in Landsmeer – 1934) the Mayor of Schagen, 1894–1900
 Gerard Kuiper (1905 in Tuitjenhorn – 1973) a Dutch–American astronomer; eponymous namesake of the Kuiper belt
 Joop Klant (1915 in Warmenhuizen – 1994) a Dutch economist, novelist and academic
 Ben Essing (1935 in Dirkshorn – 1994) a Dutch impresario
 Cees Geel (born 1965 in Schagen) a Dutch television, radio and film actor 
 Bianca Krijgsman (born 1968 in Oudesluis) a comedian and Dutch actress 
 Daniella van Graas (born 1975 in Tuitjenhorn) a Dutch fashion model, cover girl, and actress 
 Femke Meines (born 2000 in Tuitjenhorn) a Dutch singer and actress

Sport 
 Rein Boomsma (1879 in Schagen – 1943 in Neuengamme concentration camp) a Dutch footballer
 Richard Rozendaal (born 1972 in Warmenhuizen) a track cyclist, competed at the 1996 Summer Olympics
 Ruben Houkes (born 1979 in Schagen) a Dutch judoka, bronze medallist at the 2008 Summer Olympics  
 Celeste Plak (born 1995 in Tuitjenhorn) a Dutch volleyball player

Gallery

References

External links

Official website
 http://www.geheugenvanschagen.nl

 
Cities in the Netherlands
Municipalities of North Holland
Populated places in North Holland